Gembone, also known as gem bone, agatized dinosaur bone, or dinogem, is mineralized bone, often dinosaur bone, which occurs when minerals from groundwater are deposited within the bones. It is one of five gemstones created from organisms (the others being pearl, ammolite, amber and jet). Many minerals can be found in gembone including agate, hematite, iron, pyrite, jasper, marcasite, quartz or other crystal. Aside from their use in jewelry, scientists can use this type of specimen to perform research into the anatomic structure of ancient species.

Controversy 
Due to the rarity and irreplaceability of dinosaur bones, the acquisition, ownership and use of gembone is a contentious topic. In many countries it is illegal to dig up and sell dinosaur bones without permission, for example the United States, where it is illegal to dig for bones on public land without a permit from the Secretary of the Interior. As with all dinosaur specimens, collectors may find specimens by making legal deals with private landowners or by purchasing illicitly obtained fossils. In recent years, several new species of saurids have been identified from mineralised dinosaur fossils, highlighting the importance of these specimens to science. Scientists are also concerned that a lot of context is being lost when fossils are pulled out of the ground and sold by amateur hunters, while the collectors state that the fossils will just be lost to the ages if left to erode in the ground. In 2020, the United States Court of Appeals for the Ninth Circuit ruled that under Montana law, dinosaur fossils are not minerals because, regardless of the mineral content of the skeleton, they are "valuable because of characteristics other than mineral content".

References

Minerals